Henry Howey Robson VC (18 February 1894 –  4 March 1964) was an English recipient of the Victoria Cross, the highest and most prestigious award for gallantry in the face of the enemy that can be awarded to British and Commonwealth forces.

Robson was 20 years old, and a private in the Second Battalion, The Royal Scots (The Lothian Regiment), British Army during World War I when the following deed took place for which he was awarded the Cross.

On 14 December 1914 near Kemmel, Flanders/Belgium, during an attack on a German position, Private Robson left his trench under very heavy fire and rescued a wounded NCO. Subsequently, during another attack, he tried to bring a second wounded man into cover, while exposed to heavy fire. In this attack he was wounded almost at once, but persevered in his efforts until wounded a second time.

His Victoria Cross is now displayed at the Royal Scots Museum in the Edinburgh Castle of Scotland.

Robson moved to Canada in 1923 (after selling his medals for the trip), married Alice Maud Martin and served as a Sergeant-at-Arms in the Ontario Parliament in the 1930s in Toronto. He retired as information clerk in 1954 and died at Sunnybrook Hospital in 1964.

References

Sources
 Monuments to Courage (David Harvey, 1999)
 The Register of the Victoria Cross (This England, 1997)
 VCs of the First World War - 1914 (Gerald Gliddon, 1994)

1894 births
1964 deaths
People from South Shields
Royal Scots soldiers
British World War I recipients of the Victoria Cross
British Army personnel of World War I
English emigrants to Canada
British Army recipients of the Victoria Cross
Military personnel from County Durham
Burials at York Cemetery, Toronto